Tariqilabeo is a genus of fish in the family Cyprinidae native to Asia.

Species
There are currently 2 recognized species in this genus:
 Tariqilabeo bicornis (H. W. Wu, 1977) 
 Tariqilabeo macmahoni (Zugmayer, 1912)

References

Cyprinidae genera
Cyprinid fish of Asia